A constitutional referendum was held in Madagascar on 17 September 1995. The proposed amendment would allow the President to appoint and sack the Prime Minister rather than the National Assembly. It was approved by 64% of voters, with a 65% turnout.

Results

References

Referendums in Madagascar
1995 referendums
1995 in Madagascar
Constitutional referendums in Madagascar
September 1995 events in Africa